Matthias Dropa (born between 1646 and 1665 – 25 September 1732) was a German organ builder. A pupil of Arp Schnitger, he built organs in Northern Germany, including St. Michaelis, Lüneburg.

Career 
Born in Transylvania, Dropa worked as an assistant of Arp Schnitger, probably between 1680 and 1692. He founded his own workshop in 1692 and achieved the citizenship of Hamburg on 18 November 1692. He built in 1696 three new organs in Bargteheide and Finkenwerder. From 1698 to 1700, he expanded the organ Cuxhaven-Altenbruch. He moved to Lüneburg in 1705, where he built a new organ at St. Michaelis, together with his assistant . From 1712 to 1715, he expanded the organ of St. Johannis, supervised by Georg Böhm by a pedal. The organ builder  married his daughter Catharina Margaretha on 22 June 1734. Dropa died in Lüneburg.

Works

Literature 
 Gustav Fock: Arp Schnitger und seine Schule. Ein Beitrag zur Geschichte des Orgelbaues im Nord- und Ostseeküstengebiet. Bärenreiter, Kassel 1974,

References

External links 
 
 Geschichte der Orgel in Cuxhaven-Altenbruch

German pipe organ builders
People from Lüneburg
17th-century births
1732 deaths